Alex Daniels (born November 27, 1986) is an American football defensive end who is currently a free agent. He was signed by the Oakland Raiders as an undrafted free agent in 2010.

College career
Daniels spent his first two years at Minnesota before transferring to Cincinnati due to legal issues. He sat out the 2007 season, and played 2 more years at Cincinnati. He played fullback, running back, and linebacker at Minnesota, before transferring to Cincinnati where he played defensive tackle.

Professional career

Oakland Raiders
Daniels went undrafted in the 2010 NFL Draft. He later signed with the Oakland Raiders to play defensive end. Shortly into training camp, they moved him to fullback, and then back to defensive end. He was waived/injured on September 4, 2010, and cleared waivers and reverted to injured reserve. They waived him with an injury settlement on September 15, 2010.

Dallas Cowboys
Daniels signed to the Dallas Cowboys' practice squad on October 5, 2010, after a workout with the team earlier in the day. He will be moved back to fullback, and will also play tight end. He was cut on November 24, 2010. The Cowboys re-signed him to the practice squad on November 29, 2010, when Andrew Sendejo was promoted to the active roster. He was switched back to defensive end. Daniels was released from the practice squad on December 29, 2010. He was re-signed after the season on January 3, 2011. He was waived/injured on August 16, and after clearing waivers, reverted to injured reserve on August 19. He was released from injured reserve with an injury settlement on September 1.

New Orleans Saints
Daniels signed with the New Orleans Saints on July 31, 2012.

Edmonton Eskimos
Daniels was signed by the Eskmos on September 25, 2012.

References

External links
Edmonton Eskimos player bio
Minnesota Golden Gophers bio
Cincinnati Bearcats bio
Oakland Raiders bio
Dallas Cowboys bio
New Orleans Saints bio

1986 births
Living people
American football defensive ends
Minnesota Golden Gophers football players
Cincinnati Bearcats football players
Oakland Raiders players
Dallas Cowboys players
Chicago Rush players
New Orleans Saints players
Edmonton Elks players
Cleveland Gladiators players
Sportspeople from Lorain, Ohio